Penuganchiprolu is a village in NTR district of the Indian state of Andhra Pradesh. It is the mandal headquarters of Penuganchiprolu mandal in Nandigama  revenue division.

Geography

It has an average elevation of 42 metres (141 feet).It is located 144 km west from District headquarters Machilipatnam.This place lies in the border of Krishna District(Town: Jaggayyapet), Khammam District(Town: Madhira) and Khammam District(City: Khammam).

History 
Andhra Ratna Gopalakrishnayya Duggirala (1889-1928) born in our penuganchiprolu
Gopalakrishnayya Duggirala was one of the famous leaders in the non-violent Indian Freedom Movement. 
Kommaraju Laxmana Rao, a great literature was also born in Penuganchiprolu.He Started "Sri Krishna Telugu maha Sabha" in Hyderabad.
Penuganchprolu is also famous for agriculture, political movement and high skilled technical professionals are available.

Temples

Penuganchiprolu Previously Called "Pedakanchi" . There Are More Than 101 Temples In Penuganchprolu. Penuganchiprolu Is One Of The Great Piligrim Places In Andhra Pradesh. The Temple Named Sri Lakshmi Tirupatamma Devastanam Has The Great Goddess "Sri Laxmi Tirupathamma, Gopaiah". Every Year, More Than Ten Lacs Of Piligrams Visit ThIs Temple. Thousands Of Women Carry Bonalu (Recipi Cooked With Rice, Milk And Jaggery) As Offering For The Temple Fair (Tirunallu) At Penuganchiprolu. Prime Attraction Is The Sri Tirupatamma Ammavari Temple.

Sri Lakshmi Tirupatamma temple that was built as far back as in the seventeenth century is attracting streams of devotees round the year and is one of the very famous temples in the Krishna district of Andhra Pradesh, whose phenomenal growth started from the date of her immolation (Agnipravesham).

Every year lakhs of devotees visit the temple seeking Sri Lakshmi Tirupatamma talli(Mother/Goddess) blessings during Tirunallu (Ritual celebrated during the months of March and April). Penuganchiprolu is a village located in the Krishna district of Andhra-Pradesh state, India. This Place is in the border of the Krishna District and Khammam District.

Sri Tirupatamba is worshipped in the Penuganchiprolu Temple as the image of "Shakti". She preached virtuous qualities of life to her devotees and made her, abode at Penuganchiprolu.Mudiraj Papamamba was her principal devotee and therefore, her family members are ordained to perform poojas and other sevas in the Temple.

According to the folklore there were 101 Temples existing in ancient times and therefore, it was deemed as Pedakanchipuram. Muniyeru (a stream) flowing, along the Temple and it was said to be created with the spiritual power of Moudgalya Maharishi and hence it was named after him.

According to temple assistant executive office Meda Gopala Rao the annual income had touched Rs.11+ crore. A diamond crown worth Rs.2 crore had been presented to the deity. The temple authorities have also deposited Rs.5 crore with the government for the acquisition of 16 acres adjacent to the temple for developing more amenities for pilgrim.(The Hindu - 09-04-2013)

Transport 

Penuganchiprolu is the reachable place to 3 districts Krishna(Vijaywada), Suryapet(Kodad), Khammam(khammam). From Vijayawada for every 1 hour, you can get an APSRTC bus.

See also 
List of villages in Krishna district

References 

Villages in Krishna district
Mandal headquarters in Krishna district